Sant Martí dels Castells is a deserted locality located in the municipality of Bellver de Cerdanya, in Province of Lleida province, Catalonia, Spain. As of 2020, it has a population of 0.

Geography 
Sant Martí dels Castells is located 212km northeast of Lleida.

References

Populated places in the Province of Lleida